Lincoln H. Fitzell, Jr. (April 13, 1903 – September 5, 1958) was an American poet.

Life
He was born on April 13, 1903 in San Francisco, California to Edith G. Weck and Lincoln H. Fitzell, Sr. He graduated from Harvard University, and University of California, Berkeley.
He was a member of the Poetry Guild, and was a friend of Robert Penn Warren He was a friend of John Conley.  He corresponded with Alan Swallow.
He was a friend of Harvey Ferguson.
He worked as a longshoreman, and married Edith Nichols, in 1928. They had a son.

His work appeared in the Nation, Poetry Saturday Review, The New Republic, Prairie Schooner, Southern Review, Virginia Quarterly Review, New Mexico Quarterly,

Legacy
His papers are at the University of California, Berkeley, and UCLA.

Awards
 1937/1938 Shelley Memorial Award

Works

Poetry

Stories

Anthology

References

1903 births
1958 deaths
Harvard University alumni
University of California, Berkeley alumni
Place of death missing
20th-century American poets